Phyllonorycter tridentatae is a moth of the family Gracillariidae. It is known from the Iberian Peninsula.

The larvae feed on Chamaespartium tridentatum. They probably mine the leaves of their host plant.

References

tridentatae
Moths of Europe
Moths described in 2006